Joshua Willmer (born 1 December 2004) is a New Zealand para-swimmer who represented his country at the 2022 World Para Swimming Championships and 2022 Commonwealth Games, where he won a gold medal in the 100 m breaststroke SB8 event.

Willmer was educated at Howick College in Auckland.

References

External links
 
 
 

2004 births
Living people
New Zealand male breaststroke swimmers
Paralympic swimmers of New Zealand
S9-classified Paralympic swimmers
Commonwealth Games competitors for New Zealand
Commonwealth Games gold medallists for New Zealand
Commonwealth Games medallists in swimming
Swimmers at the 2022 Commonwealth Games
Swimmers from Auckland
People educated at Howick College
21st-century New Zealand people
Parasports in New Zealand
Disability in New Zealand
Medallists at the 2022 Commonwealth Games